Edgewood station may refer to:

Edgewood Railroad Station (New York), a former Ulster and Delaware Railroad station in Edgewood, New York
Edgewood station (LIRR), a former flag stop on the Main Line of the Long Island Rail Road
Edgewood station (MARC) a commuter railroad station in Edgewood, Maryland
Edgewood / Candler Park station, a MARTA station in Atlanta, Georgia

See also
Edgewood (disambiguation)